Tritimovirus is a genus of viruses, in the family Potyviridae. Plants serve as natural hosts. There are six species in this genus.

Taxonomy
The genus contains the following species:
 Brome streak mosaic virus
 Oat necrotic mottle virus
 Tall oatgrass mosaic virus
 Wheat eqlid mosaic virus
 Wheat streak mosaic virus
 Yellow oat-grass mosaic virus

Structure
Viruses in Tritimovirus are non-enveloped, with flexuous and filamentous geometries. The diameter is around 12-15 nm, with a length of 690-700 nm. Genomes are linear, monopartite or bipartite, and around 9.3-10.0kb in length.

Life cycle
Viral replication is cytoplasmic. Entry into the host cell is achieved by penetration into the host cell. Replication follows the positive stranded RNA virus replication model. Positive stranded RNA virus transcription is the method of transcription. The virus exits the host cell by tubule-guided viral movement.
Plants serve as the natural host. The virus is transmitted via a vector (mite). Transmission routes are vector and mechanical.

References

External links
 Viralzone: Tritimovirus
 ICTV

Potyviridae
Virus genera